Cecil Shearman (31 March 1899 – 15 June 1974) was a South African cricketer. He played in thirty first-class matches for Border from 1920/21 to 1937/38.

See also
 List of Border representative cricketers

References

External links
 

1899 births
1974 deaths
South African cricketers
Border cricketers
Cricketers from Pretoria